The Angwa Sandstone is a geological formation of the mid-Triassic, consisting mainly of sandstone.

Geology 
The formation is a sedimentary unit, consisting mainly of fluvial sands and silts.

It has been dated as covering rocks from much of the Triassic, with pollen and flora identified from the Induan, and Ladinian  to Norian.

Stratigraphy 
The Angwa Sandstone is the lowest formation in the Upper Karoo Group of the Karoo Supergroup, underlying the Pebbly Arkose Formation and overlying the Lower Karoo Group. The formation is divided into two members: the Alternations Member and the Massive Sandstone (Chirambakadoma) Member.

The Angwa Sandstone has been correlated to the Molteno Formation of the Great Karoo Basin, South Africa, and to the Escarpment Grit of the Mid-Zambezi Basin.

Occurrence 
The Angwa Sandstone Formation is found in Mozambique, Zambia, Zimbabwe, in the Mana Pools and Cabora Bassa Basins.

Flora

References 

Geologic formations of Mozambique
Geologic formations of Zambia
Geologic formations of Zimbabwe
Triassic System of Africa
Sandstone formations
Fluvial deposits
Paleontology in Zimbabwe